Netra is a village within the jurisdiction of the Jibantala police station in the Canning II CD block in the Canning subdivision of the South 24 Parganas district in the Indian state of West Bengal.

Geography

Demographics
As per 2011 Census of India, Netra had a total population of 4,154.

Transport
Netra is on the Bodra-Jibantala Road.

Healthcare
Matherdighi Rural Hospital, with 30 beds, at Matherdighi, is the major government medical facility in the Canning II CD block.

References

Villages in South 24 Parganas district